The Roman Catholic Diocese of Pinar del Río (erected 20 February 1903) is a suffragan diocese of the Archdiocese of San Cristobal de la Habana seated in the city of Pinar del Río.

Bishops

Ordinaries
Braulio Orue-Vivanco (1903-1904)
José Manuel Dámaso Ruíz y Rodríguez (1907-1925), appointed Archbishop of San Cristobal de la Habana.
Evelio Díaz-Cía (1941-1959), appointed Auxiliary Bishop of San Cristobal de la Habana.
Manuel Pedro Rodríguez Rozas (1960-1978)
Jaime Lucas Ortega y Alamino (1978-1981), appointed Archbishop of San Cristobal de la Habana; elevated to Cardinal in 1994.
José Siro González Bacallao (1982-2006) 
Jorge Enrique Serpa Pérez (2006-2019) - Bishop Emeritus.
Juan de Dios Hernandez-Ruiz, S.J. (2019–present)

Other priest of this diocese who became bishop
Manuel Hilario de Céspedes y García Menocal, appointed Bishop of Matanzas on May 7, 2005.

External links and references

Pinar del Rio
Pinar del Rio
Pinar del Rio
Roman Catholic Ecclesiastical Province of (San Cristóbal de) la Habana